The men's decathlon at the 1954 European Athletics Championships was held in Bern, Switzerland, at Stadion Neufeld on 26 and 27 August 1954.

Medalists

Results

Final
26/27 August

Participation
According to an unofficial count, 19 athletes from 14 countries participated in the event.

 (1)
 (1)
 (1)
 (2)
 (1)
 (1)
 (2)
 (1)
 (1)
 (1)
 (2)
 (1)
 (2)
 (2)

References

Decathlon
Combined events at the European Athletics Championships